Conor Parke (born around 1994) is a dual player. He plays Gaelic football and hurling for St Eunan's, as well as hurling for the Donegal county team.

Parke has two Donegal Senior Football Championships with his club, won in 2012 and 2014. He scored a point in the 2014 final.

Under the management of Rory Gallagher, Parke received a call-up to the Donegal senior football panel in late 2014. He started Gallagher's first match in charge, a 2015 Dr McKenna Cup away defeat to Derry. He is a former under-21 player for the county football team.

Parke played hurling for Donegal in the 2019 Christy Ring Cup.

Honours

County
 Ulster Senior Football Championship runner-up: 2015
 Ulster Under-21 Football Championship runner-up: 2013, 2014, 2015

Club
Football
 Donegal Senior Football Championship: 2012, 2014
 Donegal Under-21 Football Championship: 2014
 Donegal Minor Football Championship: 2011

Hurling
 Donegal Senior Hurling Championship runner-up: 2017
 Donegal Under-21 Hurling Championship: 2015
 Donegal Minor Hurling Championship: 2011

References

1990s births
Living people
Donegal inter-county hurlers
Dual players
People educated at St Eunan's College
St Eunan's Gaelic footballers
St Eunan's hurlers